Area codes 301 and 240 are telephone area codes in the North American Numbering Plan (NANP) for the western part of the U.S. state of Maryland. The numbering plan area (NPA) comprises Maryland's portion of the Greater Washington, D.C. metro area, portions of southern Maryland, along with rural western Maryland. This includes the communities of Cumberland, Frederick, Hagerstown, Gaithersburg, Potomac, Germantown, Bethesda, Rockville, Landover, Silver Spring, and Waldorf.

History
Area code 301 was one of the original North American area codes when the American Telephone and Telegraph Company (AT&T) established a new, nationwide telephone numbering plan in 1947. The area code served the entire state of Maryland.

Much of the Washington metropolitan area is part of a local calling area which is centered on the District's area code 202, and also extends into the suburban area in southern Maryland with 301 and Northern Virginia with area code 703. From 1947 to 1990, it was possible to dial any other telephone number in the metro area as a local call with only seven digits, not using an area code, irrespective of the home area code.  The entire metro area was also reachable via long-distance services by dialing area code 202, for which purpose AT&T had established cross-referenced operator routing codes for all affected central offices. For example, if 202-574 numbers were in use in the District or 703-574 numbers were in use in Northern Virginia, the corresponding 301-574 numbering block could only be assigned in areas considered a safe distance away from the capital, such as the Eastern Shore of Maryland.

Ten-digit dialing
By the end of the 1980s, the Washington metropolitan area was running out of unassigned prefixes for new central offices. The only available prefixes could not be assigned without breaking seven-digit dialing in the region. With this in mind, the three local operating companies of The Chesapeake and Potomac Telephone Company (C&P Telephone, later part of Bell Atlantic and now Verizon) decided to mitigate this situation by ending the code protection scheme as of October 1, 1990, with the result that all local metro area calls between Maryland, the District of Columbia, and Virginia required dialing the area code for calls to another NPA. Area code 202 was no longer useable for suburban points. Local calls within Maryland did not require the area code. Permissive dialing using the old dialing procedures continued from April 1 through October 1 1990.

Split
Despite the overall growth of the Baltimore–Washington metropolitan area, 301 remained the exclusive area code for Maryland for 44 years, making Maryland one of the largest states with a single area code. By the end of the 1980s, however, it became apparent that breaking seven-digit dialing in the Washington area would not free up enough numbers north of the Potomac River to stave off the immediate need for a new area code.

Baltimore and the Eastern Shore were split off as area code 410 on November 1, 1991. The split largely followed metropolitan area lines. There were a few exceptions, such as in Howard County, which is often recognized as part of the Baltimore metropolitan area, a small portion of the county remained in area 301, while the rest of the county was reassigned to area code 410. 

When an area code is split, the largest city, in this case Baltimore, in the old numbering plan area typically retains the existing area code to minimize expense for changing telephone numbers. in this case, however, Bell Atlantic spared the large number of federal agencies on the Maryland side of metropolitan Washington from the expense and disruption.

First overlay
Although the area code split was intended as a long-term solution, within four years 301 was close to exhaustion due to the proliferation of cell phones and pagers, especially in the Washington suburbs. In relief action, area code 240 was introduced on June 1, 1997, to form the state's first overlay.  Overlays were a new concept at the time, and met with some resistance due to the requirement for ten-digit dialing. It was decided to create an overlay rather than split the region into two new regions in order to avoid assigning a new area code to 1.2million existing phone numbers. At the time, it was predicted that it would take until 2008 to exhaust area code 240.

Second overlay
A September 2022 study projected that the 301/240 numbering plan area would suffer central office code exhausted between April and June 2023. The North American Numbering Plan Administrator has assigned area code 227 as an additional overlay code for the region. Assignment of telephone numbers with area code 227 begins on June 14, 2023.

Service area
The numbering plan area 301/240 include the counties of Allegany, Charles, Garrett, Montgomery, Prince George's, St. Mary's and Washington counties, most of Frederick County, western Howard County,, and slivers of southwestern Carroll County and western Anne Arundel County.

Local calls require ten-digit dialing (area code + number, leading "1" is not required).

Notes

References

External links

301 Area Code in Maryland
240 Area Code in Maryland

240 and 301
240
Telecommunications-related introductions in 1947